The 1939 World Table Tennis Championships – Swaythling Cup (men's team) was the 13th edition of the men's team championship.  

Czechoslovakia won the gold medal with a perfect 10–0 match record.

Swaythling Cup final table

See also
List of World Table Tennis Championships medalists

References

-